Causa e Efeito (Lit: Cause and Effect) is a 2014 Brazilian drama film directed by André Marouço,  and starring Matheus Prestes, Naruna Costa, Luiz Serra, Rosi Campos and Henri Pagnoncelli.

The plot of the film, inspired by the teachings of Allan Kardec, shows the life of officer Paulo, who loses his wife and son in an accident. Not satisfied with the fact that the killer has not been caught, he decides to take the law into his own hands. On the way, he meets a girl,  who he falls in love with. Both receive the advice of a priest, a minister and a spiritualist, and realize that they are suffering the consequences of a case that occurred in past lives.

Cast
Matheus Prestes as Paulo
Naruna Costa
Luiz Serra as Spiritualist
Rosi Campos as Medium
Henri Pagnoncelli as Gustavo

References

Brazilian drama films
2014 drama films
Films about Spiritism
2014 films
2010s Portuguese-language films